List of International cricket families is a list of people grouped by family who are associated with Test, One Day International or Twenty20 International cricket.

Afghanistan

Malik/Abid/Sadiq/Alam
Taj Malik
Hasti Gul
Karim Sadiq
Aftab Alam
Taj, Hasti, Karim and Aftab are brothers. Taj was the first coach of Afghanistan national team, while the others played international cricket.

Afghan/Janat/Salamkheil
Asghar Afghan
Karim Janat
Waqar Salamkheil
Asghar and Karim are brothers. Waqar is Asghar's nephew.

Ashraf
Mirwais Ashraf
Sharafuddin Ashraf
Mirwais and Sharafuddin are brothers.

Ahmedzai/Jamal
Raees Ahmadzai
Nasir Jamal
Raees and Nasir are brothers.

Mangal
Nowroz Mangal
Ihsanullah
Nowroz and Ihsanullah are brothers.

Zadran
Noor Ali Zadran
Mujeeb ur Rahman
Mujeeb is nephew of Noor Ali.

Australia

Agar 

 Ashton Agar
 Wes Agar

Ashton and Wes are brothers.

Alderman/Emerson
Terry Alderman
Denise Emerson
Ross Emerson
Alderman's sister Denise Emerson is married to former Test umpire Ross Emerson and herself played seven Tests for the Australian women's cricket team.

Archer
Ken Archer
Ron Archer
Ken and Ron were brothers.

Bannerman
Alec Bannerman
Charles Bannerman
Alec and Charles were brothers.

Benaud
Richie Benaud (captain)
John Benaud
Richie and John are brothers.

Blackwell

 Alex Blackwell
 Kate Blackwell
 Lynsey Askew (England)

Alex and Kate are twin sisters, and Lynsey is Alex's wife

Campbell/Ponting

Greg Campbell
Ricky Ponting (captain)
Ben Hilfenhaus
Ponting is the nephew of Campbell. Hilfenhaus is the second cousin of Ponting.

Chappell/Richardson
Vic Richardson (captain)
Ian Chappell (captain)
Greg Chappell (captain)
Trevor Chappell
Ian, Greg and Trevor Chappell are brothers and Vic Richardson's grandsons

Cooper 

 WillIam Cooper
 Paul Sheahan

Paul is the great-grandson of William.

Darling
 Joe Darling (captain)
 Rick Darling
Rick is Joe's great-nephew.

Giffen 

 George Giffen
 Walter Giffen

George and Walter are brothers.

Gregory

Dave Gregory (captain)
Ned Gregory
Syd Gregory (captain)
Harry Donnan
Jack Gregory
Dave and Ned were brothers in a family of 6 cricketing brothers. Dave and Ned made their Test debut in the same match, the first recognised Test match (played in 1877 between Australia and England in Melbourne).  Syd was Ned's son, and Harry Donnan was Ned's son-in-law.  Jack was Dave and Ned's nephew.
Nellie and Louisa Gregory are thought to be pioneering sisters (Ned's daughters) in term of the women's cricket game in Australia.

Harvey
Neil Harvey
Merv Harvey
Mick Harvey
Neil and Merv were brothers. Another brother, Mick was a Test umpire.

Haynes/Poulton 

 Rachael Haynes
 Leah Poulton

Haynes and Poulton married each other.

Healy/Starc
Ian Healy
Alyssa Healy
Mitchell Starc
Alyssa is Ian's niece. Ian was the wicketkeeper for the Australian men's team. Alyssa, currently the wicketkeeper for the Australian women's team, is married to Australian fast bowler Mitchell Starc; they are the third couple to have both played Test cricket.

Hilditch/Simpson 

 Andrew Hilditch
 Bob Simpson

Andrew is the son in law of Bob.

Hussey
Michael Hussey
David Hussey
Michael is David's elder brother.

Johnson/Park
Ian Johnson
Roy Park
Ian is the son in law of Roy.

Laughlin
Trevor Laughlin
Ben Laughlin
Ben is the son of Trevor.

Lee
Brett Lee
Shane Lee
Brett and Shane are brothers.

Lehmann/White
Darren Lehmann
Craig White (England)
Darren and Craig are brothers-in-law; Darren is married to Craig's sister Andrea. Darren's son Jake currently plays domestic cricket in Australia.

Marsh
Geoff Marsh
Shaun Marsh
Mitchell Marsh
Geoff is the father of Shaun and Mitchell.

McDermott 
 Ben McDermott
 Craig McDermott
Ben is the son of Craig. Ben's brother Alister plays domestic cricket in Australia.

McLeod 
 Bob McLeod
 Charlie McLeod
Bob and Charlie are brothers.

Pattinson
Darren Pattinson
James Pattinson
Darren and James are brothers, Darren has represented England in tests, James has represented Australia in Tests and ODIs.

Shevill/Blade
 Essie Shevill 
 Fernie Blade (née Shevill)
 Rene Shevill

All were sisters. Another sister Lily played for the New South Wales women's cricket team. Essie and Lily were twins born 6 April 1908.

Sutherland 

 Annabel Sutherland
 James Sutherland
 Will Sutherland 

Annabel played international cricket while her father James was the chief executive of Australian Cricket Board. Will, brother of Annabel, is a former player for the Australia national under-19 cricket team and currently plays in the Big Bash League

Tredrea 

 Janette Tredrea
 Sharon Tredrea

Janette and Sharon are sisters.

Trott
 Albert Trott
 Harry Trott

Albert and Harry were brothers.

Trumble
 Hugh Trumble
 Billy Trumble
Hugh and Billy were brothers.

Valetta 

 Mike Valetta
 Graeme Wood

Mike is the brother-in-law of Graeme.

Waugh
 Mark Waugh
 Steve Waugh (captain)
Mark and Steve are fraternal twin brothers. Another brother Dean played at the domestic level. Austin, the son of Steve has played for the Australia national Under-19 team.

Bangladesh

Iqbal/Khan
 Akram Khan
 Nafees Iqbal
 Tamim Iqbal
Nafees and Tamim are brothers and the nephews of Akram.

Mahmudullah/Rahim
Mushfiqur Rahim
Mohammad Mahmudullah
Mushfiqur Rahim and Mohammad Mahmudullah are co-brothers.

Bermuda

Bascome 

 Oronde Bascome
 Onias Bascome
 Okera Bascome

All three are brothers. The father of these brothers Herbert Bascome played List-A cricket for Bermuda, including the 2001 ICC Trophy.

Leverock/Greenidge 

 Dwayne Leverock
 Kamau Leverock
 Alvin Greenidge

Dwayne and Alvin are the uncles of Kamau. Alvin played international cricket for the West Indies.

Canada

Mulla
 Asif Mulla
 Mohsin Mulla
Asif and Mohsin are brothers.

England

Ali
 Moeen Ali
 Kabir Ali
Moeen and Kabir are cousins.

Bairstow
 David Bairstow
 Andrew Bairstow
 Jonny Bairstow
Jonny is the son of David. Jonny's brother Andrew has also played at the domestic level.

Broad
 Chris Broad
 Stuart Broad
Stuart is the son of Chris.

Brunt/Sciver
Katherine Brunt
Natalie Sciver
Brunt and Sciver announced their engagement in October 2019  and were married on 30 May 2022.

Butcher
Alan Butcher
Mark Butcher (captain)
Mark is the son of Alan.

Christiani 

 Cyril Christiani
 Robert Christiani

Cyril and Robert are brothers. Two more brothers Harry and Ernest played first-class cricket for British Guiana.

Compton
Denis Compton
Nick Compton
Nick is the grandson of Denis.

Cowdrey
Colin Cowdrey (captain)
Chris Cowdrey (captain)
Graham Cowdrey
Chris and Graham are the sons of Colin.

Curran
 Kevin Patrick Curran
 Kevin Curran (Zimbabwe)
 Tom Curran
 Ben Curran
 Sam Curran
Tom, Ben, and Sam are the sons of Kevin, who represented Zimbabwe in international cricket. Kevin Patrick Curran whom father to Kevin also played for Rodhasia.

Duleepsinhji/Indrajitsinhji/Ranjitsinhji/Singh
 Kumar Shri Ranjitsinhji
 KS Duleepsinhji
 Ajay Jadeja
 Hanumant Singh
Indrajitsinhji
Duleepsinhji and Hanumant, were the nephews of Ranjitsinhji. Jadeja is the great-grandnephew of Duleepsinhji. Indrajitsinhji was a cousin of Hanumant. Ajay, Hanumant and Indrajitsinhji have all played for India.

Edrich 
Bill Edrich
John Edrich

Bill and John were cousins.
Brian Edrich, Eric Edrich and Geoff Edrich were brothers of Bill, who also played first-class cricket.

Gilligan/May
Arthur Gilligan (captain)
Harold Gilligan (captain)
Peter May (captain)
Arthur and Harold were brothers. May was the son-in-law of Harold.

Grace

W. G. Grace (captain)
E. M. Grace
G. F. Grace
All were brothers, from a large family of cricketers.  All three brothers played in the same match against Australia at The Oval in 1880.

Greig
Tony Greig (captain)
Ian Greig
Tony and Ian were brothers.

Gunn
Billy Gunn
John Gunn
George Gunn
George and John were brothers and nephews of Billy. George's son G.V. Gunn played for Nottinghamshire.

Haddelsay 

 Joyce Haddelsay
 Muriel Haddelsay

Joyce and Muriel are sisters.

Hardstaff
Joe Hardstaff senior
Joe Hardstaff junior

Harris/Haig 
 Lord Harris
 Nigel Haig
Nigel is the nephew of Harris.

Harris/Kimmance 
 Grace Harris
 Laura Harris
 Delissa Kimmince
Grace and Laura are sisters. Laura and Delissa married each other.

Hearne
Frank Hearne
Alec Hearne
George Gibbons Hearne
John Thomas Hearne
Frank, George and Alec were brothers, and John was their cousin, from a large family of cricketers.

Frank Hearne played Test cricket for England against South Africa and later, having settled in South Africa, for South Africa against England. In the Cape Town Test of 1891-92, Frank played for South Africa while his two brothers and cousin were playing for England.  Frank's son, George, also played for South Africa.

Hollioake
Adam Hollioake (captain)
Ben Hollioake
Brothers Adam and Ben both made their Test debut for England in the 5th Test of the 1997 Ashes series, becoming only the third set of brothers to make their Test debut in the same match. They played 4 and 2 Tests respectively, as well as 35 and 20 ODIs respectively in their international careers.

Hutton
Sir Leonard Hutton (captain)
Richard Hutton
Sir Leonard was Richard's father.

Jones
Jeff Jones
Simon Jones
Jeff is Simon's father.

Langridge
James Langridge
John Langridge
James and John are brothers. While James played international cricket, John was an international umpire.

Lloyd
David Lloyd
Graham Lloyd
Graham was the son of David.

Mann
Frank Mann (captain)
George Mann (captain)
George was the son of Frank. Simon, the former British Army officer and mercenary, was the son of George.

Overton 

 Craig Overton
 Jamie Overton

Craig and Jamie are identical twin brothers.

Parks
Jim Parks, Sr.
Jim Parks, Jr.

Pattinson
Darren Pattinson
James Pattinson
Darren and James are brothers, Darren has represented England in tests, James has represented Australia in tests and ODIs.

Powell 

 Jane Powell
 Jill Powell

Jane and Jill are twin sisters.

Prideaux/Westbrook
Roger Prideaux
Ruth Westbrook
Ruth is the wife of Roger.

Pringle 
 Don Pringle
 Derek Pringle
Don was the father of Derek. Don played for East Africa in the 1975 World Cup.

Richardson 

 Peter Richardson
 Dick Richardson
Peter is the older brother of Dick.

Roy/Snater 

 Jason Roy
 Shane Snater

Jason and Shane are cousins. Shane played international cricket for Netherlands.

Sidebottom 
 Arnie Sidebottom
 Ryan Sidebottom
Arnie is the father of Ryan.

Smith 
 Chris Smith
 Robin Smith
Chris is the older brother of Robin.

Smith 
 Mike Smith (captain)
 Neil Smith
Mike is the father of Neil.

Stewart/Butcher 
 Alec Stewart
 Mickey Stewart
 Mark Butcher
Alec is the son and Mark is the son-in-law of Mickey. Alec and Mark were brothers-in-law. At one time in their respective playing careers. Butcher was married to Mickey's daughter Judy.

Studd 
 George Studd
 Charles Studd
George was the older brother of Charles.

Tate 
 Fred Tate
 Maurice Tate
Maurice was the son of Fred.

Townsend 
 Charlie Townsend
 David Townsend
David was the son of Charlie.

Tremlett 
 Maurice Tremlett
 Chris Tremlett
Chris is Maurice's grandson.

Tyldesley/Vaughan 
 Ernest Tyldesley
 Johnny Tyldesley
 Michael Vaughan (captain)
Ernest and Johnny were brothers. Michael is the great-grandson of one of the sisters of Johnny and Ernest.

White/Lehmann
Darren Lehmann (Australia)
Craig White
Darren and Craig are brothers-in-law, Darren is married to Craig's sister Andrea.

Willey

Peter Willey
David Willey
David is the son of Peter.

Wilson
Clem Wilson
Rockley Wilson
Clem was the older brother of Rockley.

Eswatini

Mkhatshwa 

 Ntombizodwa Mkhatshwa
 Ntombizonke Mkhatshwa

Both are twin sisters.

Guernsey

Stokes 

 Anthony Stokes
 Matthew Stokes

Anthony and Matthew are brothers

Hong Kong

Ahmed
Irfan Ahmed
Nadeem Ahmed
Irfan and Nadeem are brothers.

Ahmed/Nawaz 

 Tanveer Ahmed
 Ehsan Nawaz
Tanvir and Ehsan are brothers.

India

Ali
Wazir Ali
Nazir Ali
Wazir Ali and Nazir Ali were brothers.  They both made their Test debut in India's inaugural Test match, against England at Lord's in 1932.  Wazir Ali's son, Khalid Wazir played Test cricket for Pakistan.

Amarnath
Lala Amarnath
Surinder Amarnath
Mohinder Amarnath
Rajinder Amarnath
Surinder, Mohinder and Rajinder are sons of Lala.

Amar Singh/Ramji
 L. Amar Singh
 Ladha Ramji
They were brothers.

Apte
 Madhav Apte
 Arvind Apte
The Aptes were brothers.

Binny
 Roger Binny
 Stuart Binny
Stuart is son of Roger.

Chahar 

 Rahul Chahar
 Deepak Chahar

Rahul and Deepak Chahar are double cousins.

Edulji
 Diana Edulji
 Behroze Edulji
Diana and Behroze are sisters.

Gaekwad
 Datta Gaekwad
 Anshuman Gaekwad
Shatrunjay Gaekwad
Shatrunjay is the son of Anshuman, who is the son of Datta

Gavaskar
 Sunil Gavaskar
 Rohan Gavaskar
 Madhav Mantri
 Gundappa Viswanath
Sunil Gavaskar is Rohan's father and Mantri's nephew. Viswanath is married to Sunil Gavaskar's sister Kavita.

Ghulam Ahmed/Asif Iqbal
 Ghulam Ahmed
 Asif Iqbal
Ghulam Ahmed was the uncle of the Asif who represented Pakistan in Test cricket.

Gupte
 Subhash Gupte
 Baloo Gupte
Subhash was the elder brother of Baloo.

Kanitkar
Hemant Kanitkar
Hrishikesh Kanitkar
Hrishikesh is the son of Hemant.

Karthik/Itticheria
 Susan Itticheria
 Dinesh Karthik
Susan Itticheria played Tests and ODI for Indian Women's Team. Her daughter Dipika Pallikal Karthik an Indian squash champion is married to Dinesh Karthik.

Khan/Jilani
 Jahangir Khan
 Baqa Jilani
They were brothers in law. See also #Burki/Khan/Niazi.

Kirmani/Abid Ali
 Syed Kirmani
 Syed Abid Ali
Kirmani's daughter married Abid Ali's son in 2002, but he died in 2008.

Kripal/Milkha
 A. G. Kripal Singh
 A. G. Milkha Singh
They were brothers.

Manjrekar
 Vijay Manjrekar
 Sanjay Manjrekar
 Dattaram Hindlekar
Vijay Manjrekar was the father of Sanjay and the nephew of Hindlekar.

Mankad
 Vinoo Mankad
 Ashok Mankad

Vinoo was the father of Ashok. Rahul Mankad, another son of Vinoo, was a first-class cricketer.

Nayudu
 C. K. Nayudu
 C. S. Nayudu
C.K. was the elder brother of C.S.

Pandya
 Krunal Pandya
 Hardik Pandya
Krunal is the elder brother of Hardik.

Pataudi
Iftikhar Ali Khan, Nawab of Pataudi, senior (captain)
Mansur Ali Khan, Nawab of Pataudi, junior (captain)
Iftikhar was Mansur's father. Iftikhar played three Tests for England, before captaining the Indian team that toured England in 1946.

Pathan
Irfan Pathan
Yusuf Pathan
Irfan and Yusuf are half-brothers. Yusuf is elder to Irfan.

Roy
 Pankaj Roy
 Pranab Roy
 Ambar Roy
Pankaj was the father of Pranab and the uncle of Ambar

Rathour/Kapoor
 Vikram Rathour
 Aashish Kapoor
Brothers in law

Sharma
 Yashpal Sharma
 Chetan Sharma
Yashpal is the uncle of Chetan.

Singh
 Yuvraj Singh
 Yograj Singh
Yograj Singh is Yuvraj's father.

Ireland

Adair
Mark Adair
Ross Adair
Mark and Ross are brothers.

Delany
Laura Delany (captain)
Gareth Delany
David Delany

Laura and Gareth are siblings. David is their cousin.

Garth 
 Anne-Marie Garth
 Kim Garth

Anne-Marie is the mother of Kim. Her husband Jonathan Garth has played for Ireland at first-class and List-A level, whose son with the same name Jonathan Garth has also played domestic cricket.

Joyce/Anderson
Dominick Joyce
Ed Joyce
Cecelia Joyce (captain)
Isobel Joyce (captain)
John Anderson
All are siblings who have played Test and/or ODI cricket in the Irish men's and women's cricket teams. Dominick and Ed made their debuts for opposite teams, Ireland and England respectively. Another brother, Gus, played first-class cricket for Ireland. Isobel and Cecelia are twin sisters. Isobel married John, who played international cricket for Ireland.

Kenealy 

 Amy Kenealy
 Suzanne Kenealy

Amy and Suzanne are sisters.

Lewis 

 Gaby Lewis
 Robyn Lewis

Gaby and Robyn are sisters. Their father Alan and grandfather Ian have also played first-class cricket for Ireland.

Little
Josh Little
Hannah Little
Louise Little
Hannah and Louise are the sisters of Josh.

McCarthy 

 Barry McCarthy
 Louise McCarthy

Louise is the sister of Barry.

Mooney
John Mooney
Paul Mooney
John and Paul are brothers

O'Brien
Kevin O'Brien (captain)
Niall O'Brien
Kevin and Niall are brothers and played together in the 2007, 2011 and 2015 Cricket World Cups.

Poynter
Andrew Poynter
Stuart Poynter
Andrew and Stuart are brothers

Rankin 

 Boyd Rankin
 David Rankin

Boyd and David are brothers. Boyd has also played international cricket for England.

Jersey

Tribe 

 Asa Tribe
 Zak Tribe

Asa and Zak are brothers.

Kenya

Karim 

 Aasif Karim
 Irfan Karim

Aasif is the father of Irfan.

Odhiambo/Odoyo
Thomas Odoyo
Nelson Odhiambo

Thomas Odoyo is the uncle of Nelson Odhiambo

Odhiambo/Onyango/Ngoche
Nehemiah Odhiambo
Lameck Onyango
James Ngoche
Shem Ngoche
Nehemiah, Lameck, James and Shem are brothers. Their sisters Margaret Banja and Mary Bele have also represented Kenya, but not in international cricket.

Obuya/Otieno
Collins Obuya
David Obuya
Kennedy Otieno
All three are brothers.

Odumbe
Edward Odumbe
Maurice Odumbe
Edward and Maurice are brothers.

Suji
Tony Suji
Martin Suji
Tony and Martin are brothers.

Tikolo
David Tikolo
Steve Tikolo
Tom Tikolo, elder brother of David and Steve, played first-class cricket for Kenya.

Luxembourg

Barker
 James Barker
 Timothy Barker

James and Timothy are twin brothers.

Malaysia

Azmi 

 Sasha Azmi
 Zumika Azmi

Sasha and Zumika are sisters.

Singh 
Pavandeep Singh
 Virandeep Singh

Pavandeep and Virandeep are brothers.

Namibia

Burger
Louis Burger
Sarel Burger
Brothers. (Unrelated to Jan-Berrie Burger, despite the name.)

Kotze
Bjorn Kotze
Deon Kotze
Bjorn and Deon are brothers

Nepal

Sheikh 

 Aarif Sheikh
 Aasif Sheikh

Aarif and Aasif are brothers.

 Ngoche

Netherlands

Ahmad
 Musa Ahmad
 Shariz Ahmad
Musa and Shariz are brothers.

Cooper
Tom Cooper
Ben Cooper
Tom and Ben are brothers.

de Leede 
 Bas de Leede
 Tim de Leede
 Babette de Leede
 Frans de Leede
Bas is the son of Tim and a cousin of Babette. Frans, the father of Tim, had umpired in Women's ODIs.

Jonkman
Mark Jonkman
Maurits Jonkman
Mark and Maurits are identical twins.

Mol
Geert-Maarten Mol
Hendrik-Jan Mol
Geert and Hendrik are brothers.

Rambaldo 
 Caroline Rambaldo
 Helmien Rambaldo

Caroline and Helmien are sisters.

Seigers 
 Heather Siegers (captain)
 Silver Siegers

Heather and Silver are sisters.

Zulfiqar
Sikander Zulfiqar
Saqib Zulfiqar
Sikandar and Saqib are brothers. One more brother Asad played List-A cricket for Netherlands. In 2017, they became the first ever triplets to appear in the same professional match.

New Zealand

Anderson
Robert Anderson
Mac Anderson
William "Mac" Anderson was Robert's father.

Astle/McMillan
Lisa Astle
Nathan Astle
Craig McMillan
Nathan is married to the sister of Craig's wife. Lisa is Nathan's sister.

NB: Todd Astle is unrelated.

Bailey/Hatcher
Dot Bailey
Joan Hatcher
Dot and Joan are sisters.

Bracewell
Brendon Bracewell
John Bracewell
Doug Bracewell
Michael Bracewell
Brendon and John Bracewell are brothers. Doug Bracewell is the son of Brendon Bracewell. Doug's cousin (Brendan and John's nephew) Michael also played for New Zealand.

Bradburn
Wynne Bradburn
Grant Bradburn
Grant was the son of Wynne.

Burgess 

 Mark Burgess
 Gordon Burgess

Mark played for New Zealand while his father Gordon was a President of New Zealand Cricket Council.

Brownlee
Delwyn Brownlee
Leonie Brownlee
Delwyn and Leonie are sisters. While Delwyn played, Leonie was an umpire in women's international cricket.

Buck/Ell
Hilda Buck
Agnes Ell
Hilda and Agnes are sisters in law.

Cairns
Lance Cairns
Chris Cairns
Chris is the son of Lance.

Cave
Harry Cave
Kenneth Cave
Harry is the nephew of Kenneth. While Harry played Tests, Kenneth was a Test umpire.

Cleaver/Williamson
 Dane Cleaver
 Kane Williamson
Dane is the cousin of Kane.

Crowe
Jeff Crowe
Martin Crowe (Captain)
Jeff and Martin are brothers, sons of first-class cricketer Dave Crowe

Franklin/Coulston
James Franklin
Jean Coulston
Jean is the aunt of James.

Hadlee
Walter Hadlee
Barry Hadlee
Dayle Hadlee
Richard Hadlee
Karen Hadlee
Walter is the father of brothers Barry, Dayle and Richard.  Karen, who played in one One-day International for the New Zealand women's cricket team against England in 1977-78 was married to Richard.

Harris
Zin Harris
Chris Harris
Parke "Zin" Harris is the father of Chris Harris. Chris's brother Ben also played domestic cricket for Canterbury.

Hart
Matthew Hart
Robbie Hart
Matthew is the older brother of Robbie.

Horne
Matthew Horne
Phil Horne
Matt and Phil Horne are brothers.

Howarth
Geoffrey Howarth
Hedley Howarth
Geoff and Hedley Howarth are brothers.

Kuggeleijn
Chris Kuggeleijn
Scott Kuggeleijn
Chris is the father of Scott.

Latham
Rod Latham
Tom Latham
Tom is the son of Rod.

Leggat
Gordon Leggat
Ian Leggat
Gordon and Ian are cousins.

Marshall
Hamish Marshall
James Marshall
Hamish and James are identical twins.

McCullum
Brendon McCullum
Nathan McCullum
Nathan is the older brother of Brendon. Their father Stu played domestic cricket

McGlashan
Peter McGlashan
Sara McGlashan
Sara is the younger sister of Peter.

Murray/Kerr
 Bruce Murray
 Amelia Kerr
 Jess Kerr
Bruce is the grandfather of Amelia and Jess, whose father, Robbie Kerr, played first-class cricket in New Zealand.

Parker
John Parker
Murray Parker
John and Murray are brothers.

Pringle 

 Chris Pringle
 Tim Pringle

Tim is the son of Chris. Tim currently plays for Netherlands.

Redmond
Aaron Redmond
Rodney Redmond
Rodney is Aaron's father

Reid
John Reid (captain)
Richard Reid
John is Richard's father.

NB: John Fulton Reid is unrelated, but is the cousin of Australian Test and ODI player Bruce Reid.

Rutherford
Hamish Rutherford
Ken Rutherford
Ken is Hamish's father. Ken's brother Ian also played first-class cricket.

Satterthwaite/Tahuhu
Amy Satterthwaite
Lea Tahuhu
Amy Satterthwaite and Lea Tahuhu have been married since March 2017. They became the first international teammates to marry and the first married couple to play together.

Signal
Rose Signal
Liz Signal
Rose and Liz are twin sisters and were the first instance of twins playing in the same Test: New Zealand women against England in 1984.

Snedden
Colin Snedden
Martin Snedden
Colin is Martin's uncle. Colin's father Warwick also played first-class cricket, as did Warwick and Colin's father Nessie and uncle, Cyril Snedden. Martin's son Michael has also played first-class cricket.

Stead 
 Gary Stead
 Janice Stead
Gary is the nephew of Janice.

Tolchard/Twose
Roger Tolchard
Roger Twose
Tolchard is the nephew of Twose.

Turner 
  Glenn Turner
 Alfred Turner
Alfred is the father of Glenn. While Glenn played Tests and ODIs, Alfred stood as an umpire in Women's ODIs.

Vivian
Graham Vivian
Giff Vivian
Giff was Graham's father.

Webb
Murray Webb
Richard Webb
Murray and Richard are brothers. Note: Murray Webb played only Tests; Richard played only One Day Internationals.

Nigeria

Abdulquadri 

 Kehinde Abdulquadri
 Taiwo Abdulquadri

Kehinde and Taiwo are twin sisters.

Oman 

 Adnan Ilyas
 Aqib Ilyas

Adnan and Aqib are brothers.

Pakistan

Afridi
Shaheen Afridi
Riaz Afridi
Shahid Afridi
Irfan Afridi
Shaheen and Riaz are brothers. Shahid is the father-in-law of Shaheen. Irfan who plays for Uganda, is the nephew of Shahid.

Ahmed 
 Saeed Ahmed
 Younis Ahmed
Saeed and Younis are brothers.

Ahmed/Kardar 
 Abdul Hafeez Kardar
 Zulfiqar Ahmed
Abdul and Zulfiqar are brothers in law.

Ahmed/Malik 
 Ijaz Ahmed (cricketer, born 1968)
 Saleem Malik
Ijaz and Salim are brothers-in-law.

Akmal/Azam/Qadir
Kamran Akmal
Umar Akmal
Adnan Akmal
Babar Azam
Abdul Qadir (cricketer)
Usman Qadir
Kamran, Umar and Adnan are brothers. Kamran is the eldest and Umar the youngest. Babar Azam is their cousin. Umar is Qadir's son-in-law and Usman's brother-in-law.

Ali/Shafique
Arshad Ali
Abdullah Shafique
Abdullah is the nephew of Arshad, who played for UAE.

Burki/Khan/Niazi

Imran Khan
Javed Burki
Majid Khan
Bazid Khan
Misbah ul Haq
The first three are cousins. Baqa Jilani who was the uncle of the three, and Jahangir Khan who was the father of Majid played Test cricket for India. Bazid Khan is the son of Majid. Misbah-ul-Haq is the distant cousin of Imran Khan from the Niazi Clan

Dalpat/Kaneria
Anil Dalpat
Danish Kaneria
Anil and Danish are cousins

Elahi
Manzoor Elahi
Zahoor Elahi
Saleem Elahi
Manzoor, Zahoor and Saleem are brothers.

Farhat
 Imran Farhat
 Humayun Farhat
Brothers, with both playing test and one day cricket.

Hassan/Sajjad 
 Pervez Sajjad
 Waqar Hassan

Pervez and Waqar are brothers.

Haq
Inzamam Ul Haq
Imam Ul Haq

Imam is the nephew of Inzamam.

Imtiaz 

 Kainat Imtiaz
 Saleema Imtiaz

Saleema who is an umpire, is the mother of Kainat.

Iqbal/Miandad
Javed Miandad
Faisal Iqbal
Javed is the uncle of Faisal.

Khan
 Moin Khan
 Nadeem Khan
Azam Khan
Moin and Nadeem are brothers with both having represented the country in Tests and one-dayers. Azam is the son of Moin.

Khan 
 Shaiza Khan
 Sharmeen Khan

Shaiza and Sharmeen are sisters.

Mohammad
Hanif Mohammad
Mushtaq Mohammad
Sadiq Mohammad
Wazir Mohammad
Shoaib Mohammad
Hanif, Mushtaq, Sadiq and Wazir are brothers. A fifth brother Raees was once twelfth man for Pakistan. Hanif, Mushtaq and Sadiq all played against New Zealand at Karachi in 1969-70. Hanif is the father of Shoaib.

Nazar
Nazar Mohammad
Mudassar Nazar
Nazar Mohammad is the father of Mudassar Nazar, and also of Mubashir Nazar, who played first-class cricket in Pakistan.

Raja
Wasim Raja
Rameez Raja
Wasim and Rameez are brothers.

Rana 

 Azmat Rana
 Mansoor Rana
 Maqsood Rana
 Shafaqat Rana
 Shakoor Rana

Azmat and Shafaqat are brothers who played international cricket. Their brother Shakoor was an umpire. Shakoor's sons Mansoor and Maqsood played ODIs for Pakistan. Sultan Rana, who was Azmat's twin brother played first-class cricket.

Papua New Guinea

Amini 

 Charles Amini
 Chris Amini

Charles and Chris are brothers.

Vala/Siaka 

 Assad Vala
 Pauke Siaka

Pauke is the wife of Assad.

Romania 

 Marian Gherasim
 Laurentiu Gherasim

Marian and Laurentiu are brothers.

Rwanda

Ishimwe

 Henriette Ishimwe
 Gisele Ishimwe

Henriette and Gisele are sisters.

Scotland

Bryce 

 Kathryn Bryce
 Sarah Bryce

Kathryn and Sarah are sisters.

Drummond
Annette Drummond
Gordon Drummond

Brother and sister. Annette played in 2003 and 2013 for Scotland's Wildcats, Gordon retired as Scotland captain in 2013.

Haq/Hussain/Tahir
Omer Hussain
Majid Haq
Hamza Tahir
All three men are cousins.

Sole 

 Chris Sole
 Tom Sole

Chris and Tom are brothers.

Serbia

Zimonjic 

 Nemanja Zimonjic
 Vukasin Zimonjic

Nemanja and Vukasin are brothers.

Singapore 

 Ada Bhasin
 Riyaa Bhasin

Ada and Riyaa are twin sisters.

Sri Lanka

de Silva
Chaturanga de Silva
Wanindu Hasaranga
Chaturanga and Hasaranga are brothers

de Alwis/Silva
Guy de Alwis
Rasanjali Silva
Rasanjali is the wife of Guy.  Both played test cricket.

Fernando
Hiruka Fernando
Rose Fernando
Hiruka and Rose are sisters.

Kaluperuma
Lalith Kaluperuma
Sanath Kaluperuma
Both are brothers.

Labrooy 

 Graeme Labrooy
 Wendell Labrooy

Graeme and Wendell are brothers. While Graeme played international cricket, both of them served as match referee in international cricket.

Ranatunga
Arjuna Ranatunga
Dammika Ranatunga
Sanjeeva Ranatunga
Nishantha Ranatunga
All four were brothers.

Samaraweera
Dulip Samaraweera
Thilan Samaraweera
Dulip and Thilan are brothers

Warnapura
Bandula Warnapura
Malinda Warnapura
Upali Warnapura
Bandula is the uncle of Malinda. Malinda's father Upali officiated in Women's ODIs.

Wettimuny
Mithra Wettimuny
Sidath Wettimuny
Sunil Wettimuny
All three are brothers

South Africa

Bacher
Adam Bacher
Ali Bacher
Adam is the nephew of Ali.

Blanckenberg/Ryneveld
Jimmy Blanckenberg
Clive van Ryneveld
Jimmy was the uncle of Clive.

Callaghan/Kemp
David Callaghan
Justin Kemp
David and Justin are cousins.

Cook
Jimmy Cook
Stephen Cook (cricketer)
Jimmy is Stephen's father.

Cox/Tuckett 

 Joe Cox
 Len Tuckett
 Lindsay Tuckett

Lindsay is the son of Len and nephew of Joe.

Du Plessis/Viljoen
Faf du Plessis
Hardus Viljoen
Faf and Hardus are brothers in law. Hardus has married Rhemi who is Faf's sister.

Kapp/van Nierkirk
Marizanne Kapp
Dane van Niekerk
Van Niekerk and Kapp married in July 2018  In the Women's World T20 that year they became the first married couple to bat together in an ICC tournament.

Hands 

 Phillip Hands
 Reginald Hands

Phillip and Reginald are brothers. Another brother Kenneth played first-class cricket.

Kirsten
Peter Kirsten
Andy Kirsten
Gary Kirsten
Paul Kirsten
Paul and Gary are brothers, Andy and Peter are half-brothers of Gary and Paul. Both Peter and Gary played international cricket, while Andy was the coach of Kenya national cricket team. Gary had also coached India and South Africa.

Lindsay 

 Denis Lindsay
 Johnny Lindsay
 Neville Lindsay

Denis is the son of Johnny, while Neville is the uncle of Johnny.

Malan 

 Janneman Malan
 Pieter Malan

Janneman and Pieter are brothers. Another brother Andre played at the domestic level.

Morkel
Albie Morkel
Morné Morkel
Albie is the elder brother of Morne.

Nourse
Dave Nourse
Dudley Nourse
Dave was Dudley's father

Pithey
Tony Pithey
David Pithey
Tony and David are brothers.

Pollock
Peter Pollock
Graeme Pollock
Shaun Pollock
Peter and Graeme are brothers; Peter is Shaun's father.

Richards 

 Alfred Richards
 Dicky Richards

Alfred and Dicky are brothers.

Richardson 

 Dave Richardson
 Michael Richardson

Michael who plays for Germany, is the son of Dave.

Rowan 

 Athol Rowan
 Eric Rowan

Athol and Eric are brothers.

Snooke 

 Stanley Snooke
 Tip Snooke

Stanley and Tip are brothers.

Tancred
Bernard Tancred
Louis Tancred
Vincent Tancred
All three were brothers.

Tapscott
George Tapscott
Lionel Tapscott

George and Lionel were brothers.

Taylor 

 Dan Taylor
 Herbie Taylor

Dan and Herbie are brothers.

Wade 

 Billy Wade
 Herby Wade

Billy and Herby are brothers.

Uganda

Mukasa/Nsubuga 

 Roger Mukasa
 Frank Nsubuga

Roger and Frank are brothers. Another brother Lawrence Sematimba played first-class, List-A and T20 cricket for Uganda.

Ssenyondo/Ssesazi 

 Henry Ssenyondo
 Simon Ssesazi

Henry and Simon are brothers.

United States of America

Vaghela 
 Vatsal Vaghela
 Isani Vaghela
Vatsal and Isani are siblings.

Vanuatu

Mansale/Matautaava 

 Andrew Mansale
 Patrick Matautaava

Andrew and Patrick are cousins.

West Indies

Atkinson 
 Denis Atkinson
 Eric Atkinson

Denis and Eric are brothers.

Best 

 Carlisle Best
 Tino Best

Carlisle is the uncle of Tino.

Bravo/Lara
Darren Bravo
Dwayne Bravo
Brian Lara
Darren and Dwayne are half-brothers. Brian is uncle of Darren.

Browne/Browne-John
Beverly Browne
Louise Browne
Anne Browne-John
All three are sisters who played for the West Indian women's cricket team.

Cameron
John Cameron
Jimmy Cameron
Jimmy is the younger brother of John

Chanderpaul
Shivnarine Chanderpaul
Tagenarine Chanderpaul
Tagenarine is son of Shivnarine

Croft/Hunte
Colin Croft
Conrad Hunte
Colin Croft's father was a cousin of Conrad Hunte, Colin played for Guyana whilst Conrad played for Barbados, both played for the West Indies.

Collins/Edwards
Pedro Collins
Fidel Edwards
Fidel and Pedro are half-brothers.

Dottin/Gibson 

 Deandra Dottin
 Ottis Gibson

Deandra and Ottis are cousins.

Gibbs/Lloyd
Lance Gibbs
Clive Lloyd
Gibbs and Lloyd are cousins.

Grant
 Jackie Grant
 Rolph Grant
Both brothers captained the West Indies side.

Davis 

 Bryan Davis
 Charlie Davis

Bryan and Charlie are brothers.

Drakes 
 Dominic Drakes
 Vasbert Drakes
Dominic is the son of Vasbert.

Guillen/van Beek 

 Sammy Guillen
 Logan van Beek

Logan is the grandson of Sammy. Apart from West Indies, Sammy has also represented New Zealand in international cricket. Logan is currently a Netherlands international cricketer.

Headley
George Headley
Ron Headley
George was Ron's father. Ron's son (and George's grandson), Dean Headley, played Test cricket for England.

Holford/Sobers
David Holford
Sir Garfield Sobers
Both are cousins.

Hope 

 Kyle Hope
 Shai Hope

Kyle and Shai are brothers.

Kallicharan/Nagamootoo
Alvin Kallicharan
Mahendra Nagamootoo
Alvin is Mahendra's uncle. Both played for the West Indies and Guyana. Alvin's brother Derek also played for Guyana as did Mahendra's brother Vishal.

Kanhai/Nagamootoo
Rohan Kanhai
Mahendra Nagamootoo
Rohan is Mahendra's uncle. Both played for the West Indies and Guyana.

Knight 
 Kycia Knight
 Kyshona Knight
Kycia and Kyshona are twin sisters.

Marshall 
 Norman Marshall
 Roy Marshall
Norman and Roy are brothers.

Murray/Weekes
David Murray
Sir Everton Weekes
David is Everton's son. Both played for the West Indies and Barbados. David's son Ricky Hoyte also played for Barbados

Reifer
Raymon Reifer
Floyd Reifer
Leslie Reifer
All of them are cousins. While Raymon and Floyd played international cricket, Leslie was an umpire.

Samuels
Marlon Samuels
Robert Samuels
Robert is the older brother of Marlon

Scott 
 Alfred Scott
 Tommy Scott

Afred is the son of Tommy.

Shillingford
 Grayson Shillingford 
 Irvine Shillingford 
 Shane Shillingford 
Grayson and Irvine were cousins while Shane is related to both. All three played tests for West Indies while Irvine also played ODIs.

Simmons 
 Lendl Simmons
 Phil Simmons
Phil is Lendl's uncle.

St Hill 
 Edwin St Hill
 Wilton St Hill
Edwin and Wilton are brothers.

Stollmeyer
Jeffrey Stollmeyer
Victor Stollmeyer
The Stollmeyer brothers played cricket for the West Indies and Trinidad and Tobago.

Walcott
Clyde Walcott
Keith Walcott
While Clylde played for West Indies, Keith was a selector and assistant manager of the West Indies cricket team.

Zimbabwe

Curran
 Kevin Curran
 Tom Curran
 Ben Curran
 Sam Curran
Tom, Ben, and Sam are the sons of Kevin, and represent England in international cricket.

Ebrahim 

 Dion Ebrahim
 Kate Ebrahim

Kate is the wife of Dion, who played for New Zealand in international cricket.

Ervine 
Sean Ervine
Craig Ervine
Sean and Craig are brothers.

Evans 

 Brad Evans
 Craig Evans

Craig is the father of Brad.

Flower
Grant Flower
Andy Flower (captain)
Grant and Andy are brothers.

Jarvis
Malcolm Jarvis
Kyle Jarvis
Malcolm is the father of Kyle.

Kaia 

 Innocent Kaia
 Roy Kaia

Innocent and Roy are brothers. Knowledge Kaia, who is eldest of the three, played first class cricket in Zimbabwe.

Masakadza
Hamilton Masakadza
Shingirai Masakadza
Wellington Masakadza
Hamilton and Shingirai are both older brothers to Wellington

Rennie
Gavin Rennie
John Rennie
Gavin and John are brothers.

Strang
Bryan Strang
Paul Strang
Bryan and Paul are brothers.

Note: All three pairs of Flowers, Rennies and Strangs played in a Test against New Zealand at Harare in September 1997.

Streak
Heath Streak
Denis Streak
Heath is the son of Denis. While Heath played for Zimbabwe, Denis was a national selector. Denis had played for the national team before they were awarded Test status.

Tiripano
Donald Tiripano
Chipo Mugeri-Tiripano
Chipo is the wife of Donald.

Waller
Andy Waller
Malcolm Waller
Andy is the father of Malcolm.

Whittall
Andrew Whittall
Guy Whittall
Andrew and Guy are cousins.

See also 
 List of professional sports families

References

External links
Cricinfo: Related Test Players
Gajab Chij: Cricketers who have most beautiful wives 

Families
Families
Families
Cricket-related lists
 
cricket